Feroze Ghayas (born 3 May 1973) is an Indian former cricketer. He played first-class cricket for Delhi and Haryana between 1992 and 2001.

See also
 List of Delhi cricketers

References

External links
 

1973 births
Living people
Indian cricketers
Delhi cricketers
Haryana cricketers
Cricketers from Delhi